The 25th Parachute Division (French: 25e Division Parachutiste, 25e D.P) was an airborne division of the French Army, part of the French Airborne Units. Consisting mainly of air infantry specialized in airborne combat, air assault and established in 1956; the Parachute Division took principal part only in the Algerian War.

Creation and different designations 
 June 1, 1956  : Creation of the 25th Parachute Division
 April 30, 1961: the 25th Parachute was dissolved
 In 1961 : following the putsch, the 10th Parachute Division and 25th Parachute Division were dissolved and formed on May 1, 1961, with the 11th Infantry Division, the 11th Light Intervention Division, which would later become the 11th Parachute Brigade.

Constitution 

On June 1, 1956, the 25th Parachute Division was created in the 5th military region from the 25e DIAP and the Colonial Parachute Brigade. The division included five airborne infantry Regiments, two airborne cavalry regiments and one unit of Parachute Artillery:

 Command and Support Structure
 75th Headquarters Company (75e  CGQ)
 75th Transmission Company (75e  CT)
 French Army Light Aviation (ALAT) Platoon
 513th Transport Group ( GT 513)
 75th Parachute Engineer Company (75e CGAP)
 75th Repair Division Company (75e  CRD)
 75th Medical Company (75e CM)
 75th SRI 
 General Command Staff of the 1st Brigade
 General Command Staff of the 2nd Brigade
 Airborne Infantry and artillery
 2nd Foreign Parachute Regiment (1956-1961).
 1st Parachute Chasseur Regiment (1e RCP) 
 14th Parachute Chasseur Regiment (14e RCP) 
 18th Parachute Chasseur Regiment (18e RCP)
 8th Colonial Parachute Regiment (8e RPC), created February 28, 1951, in Hanoi as the 8th Colonial Parachute Battalion; recreated on May 1, 1956, as the 8th Colonial Parachute Regiment; renamed on December 1, 1958, the 8th Marine Infantry Parachute Regiment.
 35th Parachute Artillery Regiment (35e RAP)
 Parachute Cavalry Structure
 13th Parachute Dragoon Regiment (13e RDP)
 1st Parachute Hussar Regiment (1er RHP)

During tenure, the Division witnessed changes:

 On July 1, 1957, the 13th Parachute Dragoon Regiment was reassigned and attached to the 10th Parachute Brigade.
 On April 1, 1960, the 9th Parachute Chasseur Regiment relieved the 1st Parachute Chasseur Regiment, part of the 10th Parachute Division.

On December 1, 1958, the Colonial Parachute Regiments underwent a designation change to Marine Infantry Parachute Regiments while retaining their numerical designation.

Division Commanders 

 1956 - 1956 : General Jean Gilles             
 1956 - 1958 : General Henri Sauvagnac
 1958 - 1960 : General Ducournau
 1960 - 1961 : General Autrand

History

Battle of the Frontiers 

Two of the five airborne infantry regiments of the division; mainly, the 8th Colonial Parachute Regiment and the 14th Parachute Chasseur Regiment; participated from January to May 1958 in the Battle of Frontiers. Accordingly, General Raoul Salan, superior commander in Algeria, delegated all five airborne infantry regiments to General Paul Vanuxem; commander of the zone est-constantinois (ZEC). The battle took place at both the Morice Line and Challe Line and lasted for about 5 months.

See also 

 Airborne units of France
 10th Parachute Division
 11th Parachute Brigade
Pierre Côme André Segrétain
Pierre Paul Jeanpierre
Barthélémy Rémy Raffali
Paul Arnaud de Foïard
Hélie de Saint Marc
Georges Hamacek

References

Sources and bibliography 
 Collectif, Histoire des parachutistes français, Société de Production Littéraire, 1975.
 J. Baltzer & E. Micheletti, Insignes et brevets parachutistes de l'armée française, Histoires et collections, 2001, .

External links 
History of the 1st Parachute Chasseur Regiment, 9th Parachute Chasseur Regiment, 14th Parachute Chasseur Regiment and 18th Parachute Chasseur Regiment

Airborne divisions of France
Military units and formations established in 1956
Military units and formations disestablished in 1961
1956 establishments in France
1961 disestablishments in France